William Waugh Neil (born 10 November 1944) is a retired Scottish professional footballer who made over 180 appearances in the Football League for Millwall as a left winger.

Playing career
After retiring as a player, Neil settled in Lewisham. As of November 2014, He had been on the club's staff for 50 years, firstly as a player, then a youth coach and then in the commercial department. He is a member of the Millwall Hall of Fame and a lounge at The Den is named for him.

Career statistics

Honours 
Millwall

 Football League Third Division second-place promotion: 1965–66
 Football League Fourth Division second-place promotion: 1964–65

Individual

 Millwall Hall of Fame
 Football League Unsung Hero: 2012–13

References

External links

1944 births
Scottish footballers
English Football League players
Sportspeople from Midlothian
Association football wingers
Millwall F.C. players
Bonnyrigg Rose Athletic F.C. players
Living people
Millwall F.C. non-playing staff
Scottish Junior Football Association players